The 1900 Central Michigan Normalites football team represented Central Michigan Normal School, later renamed Central Michigan University, as an independent during the 1900 college football season. They only played one game, a 20–5 win against Cadillac High School. Their head coach was unknown.

Schedule

References

Central Michigan
Central Michigan Chippewas football seasons
Central Michigan Normalites football